"Time Flies" is a song by Drake from his mixtape Dark Lane Demo Tapes.

Despite not being released as a single, the song was a Top 30 hit in both Canada and US, peaking at No. 22 and No. 30 respectively.

Chart performance

Certifications

Tori Kelly version

Tori Kelly covered the song for her extended play Solitude. It was released as a single on July 22, 2020.

The day before its release, Kelly posted a YouTube video covering Drake's song "Time Flies". It was revealed that it would be a single for her upcoming EP, Solitude.

References

2020 singles
2020 songs
Drake (musician) songs
Tori Kelly songs
Capitol Records singles
Songs written by Drake (musician)
Songs written by Oz (record producer)